Gustav Hilmar, real name Gustav Černý (30 January 1891 – 19 March 1967) was a Czech film actor. He appeared in 46 films between 1927 and 1964.

He is buried at the Vinohrady Cemetery.

Selected filmography

 Hordubalové (1937)
 Andula Won (1937)
 The Lantern (1938)
 Škola základ života (1938)
 Eva tropí hlouposti (1939)
 Muzikantská Liduška (1940)
 Pacientka Dr. Hegla (1940)
 The Girl from Beskydy Mountains (1944)
 Rozina, the Love Child (1945)
 The Adventurous Bachelor (1946)
 Průlom (1946)
 Capek's Tales (1947)
 The Secret of Blood (1953)
 Jan Hus (1954)
 Jan Žižka (1955)
 Against All (1956)

References

External links
 

1891 births
1967 deaths
Czech male film actors
Czech male stage actors
People from Mladá Boleslav